Shah Paran was a 14th-century Sufi saint of the Sylhet region. In 1303, he took part in the final battle of the Conquest of Sylhet led by his maternal uncle Shah Jalal.

Biography

Shah Paran's birth name is unknown though it has been suggested that his name was Farhan which later got corrupted into Poran, meaning "soul". Poran is used as a term of endearment in the Bengali language. Others suggest that Shah Paran was a corruption of Shah Piran meaning "king of pirs".

He was born in Hadramaut, Yemen in the 13th century. His father's name was Muhammad who died when Paran was 11 years old. Paran studied under his grandfather Syed Ahmad Kabir Suhrawardi and later with Amin, a dervish from Neshapur. He decided to accompany Shah Jalal, his maternal uncle, in his expedition across the Indian subcontinent to propagate the religion of Islam. In 1303, Paran took part in the final battle of the Conquest of Sylhet under Shah Jalal's leadership against Raja Gour Govinda.

Some time after, Paran was said to have consumed one of the Jalali Kobutor, the pigeons that Jalal received as a gift from Nizamuddin Auliya in Delhi. As a result, Paran was banished outside of Sylhet town. He established a khanqah on top of a hill in modern-day Khadim Nagar, Dakshingarh which came to be known as Shah Paran's hill.

Death and legacy

Paran died unmarried and with no descendants. He was buried near his khanqah. A dargah complex was built with a neighbouring mosque, eidgah, langar khana, female prayer space and pond. For centuries, large numbers of devotees have visited his tomb, a practice which continues to the present time. On the 4th, 5th and 6th day of Rabi-ul-Awal, the Urs of Shah Paran takes place.

A bridge over the Surma River, a passenger ferry, and a residence hall at Shahjalal University of Science and Technology have all been named after Shah Paran.

Spiritual genealogy 
Spiritual genealogy of Shah Paran is as follows:

 Muhammad
 Ali
 Hasan al-Basri
 Habib al-Ajami
 Maruf Karkhi
 Sari al-Saqati
 Khwaja Mumshad Uluw Al Dīnawarī
 Shaykh Ahmad Aswad Dinnuri
 Shaykh Abu Muhammad Amwiya
 Shaykh Azi Uddin Suhrawardi
 Shaykh Abu Nazib Ziauddin
 Shaykh Hisab Al-Din
 Shaykh Makhdum
 Bahauddin Zakariya
 Jalaluddin Surkh-Posh Bukhari
 Shaykh Ahmad Kabir Suhrawardi
 Shaykh Jalal
 Shah Paran

See also
 List of Sufis
 Islam in Bangladesh

References

14th-century Indian Muslims
Hadhrami people
People from Sylhet
Indian people of Arab descent
Bengali Sufi saints